The name Nona has been used for three tropical cyclones worldwide, one in the Central Pacific and two in the Western Pacificthe second use in the latter basin was in the Philippines by the PAGASA.

Central Pacific: 
 Tropical Storm Nona (1994), a short-lived tropical storm that did not affect land. 

Western Pacific: 
 Typhoon Nona (1952) (T5212), a Category 1 typhoon that struck the Philippines and southern China.
 Typhoon Melor (2015) (T1527, 28W, Nona), a Category 4 typhoon that made multiple landfalls in the Philippines.

PAGASA retired the name Nona after the 2015 typhoon season, and replaced it with Nimfa.

Pacific hurricane set index articles
Pacific typhoon set index articles